Juan Tamad at Mister Shooli: Mongolian Barbecue is a 1991 Filipino comedy film co-written and directed by Jun Urbano. The film stars Eric Quizon and Urbano as the titular Juan and Mister Shooli respectively. It is an official entry to the 1991 Metro Manila Film Festival.

A sequel, Ang M.O.N.A.Y. ni Mr. Shooli (Misteyks Opda Neysion Adres Yata), was released on March 21, 2007.

Plot
Mr. Shooli, a Mongolian man, tells a story about one of his adventures to a group of children.

1,500 years Before Cory, the land of Lawang-Lawa gains independence after a big battle against a combined force of Spaniards, Americans and Japanese. As its citizens quarrel over how to govern themselves, Manhik Manaog proposes to establish a representative democracy, albeit with flawed definitions. At the marketplace, Mr. Shooli meets Juan Tamad, a lazy but good-hearted man, who helps him sell defective pots that lead to Mr. Shooli being chased and mauled by angry customers. Juan Tamad saves him and restores him back to health. 

A group led by Kulas and claiming to be Juan Tamad's creditors show up at his house, demanding that he repay his debts by running for District Representative in upcoming elections for Congress, with Kulas as his adviser. Juan engages on a difficult but ultimately successful campaign against a wealthier and ruthless Manhik Manaog, who goes as far as hiring a Nazi to train his private army on how to intimidate and steal the election. At Juan's victory party, Manhik Manaog shows up to offer reconciliation, but plots with Kulas to control Juan. They convince him to do their bidding in Congress by making him act as an incompetent politician who promotes corruption, crime and bureaucratic inefficiency, despite warnings by Mr. Shooli and Juan's love interest, Manhik Manaog's daughter Zorayda. At the next electoral campaign, Juan is savagely beaten up by his constituents, but manages to stand up and harangue them for how their personalistic expectations and demands on him as a politician forced him to engage in corrupt activities after he became mired in debt. As he ends his speech, a nearby volcano erupts, causing chaos as the story ends in a cliffhanger, with Mr. Shooli's audience being fetched by their parents. 

After the children leave, Mr. Shooli discovers a girl (Aiza Seguerra) left behind who demands the ending of the story, to which Mr. Shooli replies that only the people can write its ending, which the girl implores the audience through a fourth wall to do so. 

In some versions, the appeal is followed by an on-text manifesto by civil society organizations referring to the upcoming 1992 Philippine presidential election before the credits roll.

Cast
Jun Urbano as Mr. Shooli
Eric Quizon as Juan Tamad
Jackie Lou Blanco as Zorayda
Leo Martinez as Manhik-Manaog
Caridad Sanchez as Inay Litga
Berting Labra as Gat Uto
Lou Veloso as Kulas
Shara Sanchez as Lea
L.A. Lopez as Kulit
Aiza Seguerra
Atty. Ricardo Puno as Dong Puno
Dencio Padilla as Emcee
German Moreno as Kuya Germs
Ramon Zamora as Gen. Volkswagen
Philip Supnet as Kuhol

Nominations

References

External links

1991 films
1991 comedy films
FLT Films films
Filipino-language films
Philippine comedy films
Tagalog-language films